Broc Parkes (born 24 December 1981) is an Australian motorcycle racer, best known for his success in the Supersport World Championship. He currently races in the Endurance FIM World Championship aboard a Yamaha YZF-R1.

During 2015 he raced in British Superbikes for half the season, then competed in the Endurance FIM World Championship aboard a YART Yamaha YZF-R1, before being drafted-in to MotoGP on the ART machine for the last race of the season at Valencia, held on 8 November at the Circuit Ricardo Tormo, Spain.

Early years
Born in the Hunter Region of New South Wales, resulting in the nickname 'The Boy From the Bush'. Parkes was originally inspired to race as a four-year-old, when he saw countryman Wayne Gardner winning a race. Gardner ultimately became his manager.

Parkes began racing on dirt tracks a year later, with great success. He also raced junior motorcycle speedway and finished second in the 1997 Australian Under-16 Championship in Adelaide. He then switched to circuit racing at the age of sixteen – the legal limit in Australia – going on to win the Australian 125cc title and Australian 250cc Production title in 1999, on Honda machinery.

Going International
Parkes then spent a season in Japan with the Moriwaki squad's Honda equipment, finishing third in the All Japan X Formula series. Parkes then moved to Europe to join the NCR Ducati team for the 2001 World Superbike Championship. He experienced a mechanical failure while running strongly in one race, but he took 16th overall. In 2002 he finished up 11th.

Supersport World Championship
For 2003 he moved to the Supersport World Championship for the BKM Honda team, but the team was late getting race equipment, and did not complete the year due to financial problems. He moved to the crack Ten Kate team for 2004, finishing as championship runner-up behind teammate Karl Muggeridge. For 2005 he joined Yamaha's factory team, struggling for most of 2005 but ending with a victory to come fifth overall. In 2006 he challenged for the title before a crash at Assen left him critically injured – although he returned before the end of the season to come third overall. He finished a distant second to Kenan Sofuoglu in 2007, with back-to-back wins at Brands Hatch and Lausitzring despite a broken collarbone early in the season, and finished 4th in 2008 despite a series-high six poles and a season-opening victory in Losail

Back to World Superbikes

For 2009 Parkes returns to World Superbike – on factory Kawasakis ran by Paul Bird Motorsport, teamed with former Grand Prix winner Makoto Tamada. His team often struggled for results, but he shone in a one-off appearance at the British Superbike Championship round at Brands Hatch. Parkes qualified second and finished second in all of the three races held there, only behind the dominant Leon Camier each time.

2010 was also a struggle for Parkes, who joined the new Echo CRS Honda team. He crashed heavily in pre-season and missed the first three rounds, and was usually a backmarker once he returned. Three races before the end of the season Parkes announced that he separated ways with Echo CRS Honda, and he joined the Motocard Kawasaki team, as the replacement of the injured Joan Lascorz. He also raced a few races at the end of the season in World Supersports with the same team.

Parkes continued in Supersports the next two seasons riding a Kawasaki and a Honda, finishing top five both years. In 2013 Parkes returned to Australia and raced for the factory Yamaha team, winning the Australian FX-Superbike Championship.

Move to MotoGP

In December 2013, it was announced that Parkes would be riding for Paul Bird Motorsport  alongside Michael Laverty for the 2014 MotoGP season. He effectively replaced his countryman Damian Cudlin and continued a 31-year streak of Australia's representation in the premier class of motorcycle racing.

2015

For the early part of 2015, Parkes rode for Shaun Muir Racing's Milwaukee Yamaha team in the British Superbike Championship, until he became unable to continue due to the after-effects of arm-pump surgery. Parkes then competed in Endurance FIM World Championship races on a Yamaha Austria Racing Team machine, with his final race of the season, a one-off riding for ART at Valencia, held on 8 November at the Circuit Ricardo Tormo, Spain, when he retired after completing two-thirds of the race.

Career statistics

Grand Prix motorcycle racing

By season

Races by year
(key) (Races in bold indicate pole position, races in italics indicate fastest lap)

Superbike World Championship

Races by year

Supersport World Championship

Races by year

References

External links

Australian motorcycle racers
1981 births
Living people
British Superbike Championship riders
Supersport World Championship riders
Superbike World Championship riders
Sportspeople from Newcastle, New South Wales
Tech3 MotoGP riders
MotoGP World Championship riders